Kazan (IPA: [qɑzan]) is the largest city and capital of Tatarstan, Russia. Kazan is the fifth-largest city in Russia, and the most populous city on the Volga, as well as the Volga Federal District.

Kazan became the capital of the Khanate of Kazan and was conquered by Ivan the Terrible in the 16th century, becoming a part of the Tsardom of Russia. The city was seized and largely destroyed during Pugachev's Rebellion of 1773–1775, but was later rebuilt during the reign of Catherine the Great. In the following centuries, Kazan grew to become a major industrial, cultural and religious centre of Russia. In 1920, after the Russian SFSR became a part of the Soviet Union, Kazan became the capital of the Tatar ASSR. Following the dissolution of the Soviet Union, Kazan remained the capital of the Republic of Tatarstan.

Kazan is renowned for its vibrant mix of Tatar and Russian cultures. In 2015, 2.1 million tourists visited Kazan, and 1.5 million tourists visited the Kazan Kremlin, a World Heritage Site. In April 2009, the Russian Patent Office granted Kazan the right to brand itself as the "Third Capital of Russia". In 2009 it was chosen as the "Sports capital of Russia", and it still is referred to as such. Kazan hosted the 2013 Summer Universiade, and was one of the host cities of the 2018 FIFA World Cup.

Etymology
The term kazan means 'boiler' or 'cauldron' (Russian: каза́н/Tatar: казан) in the Tatar and Turkic languages. The origin of the city and its name is often described as follows: a sorcerer advised the Bulgars to build a city where, without any fire, a boiler dug into the ground would boil water. As a result, a similar place was founded on the shore of Lake Kaban. One legend claims that the city was named after the river Kazanka, which was named after the son of a Bulgar governor who dropped a copper cauldron into it.

History

Middle Ages

According to the official version adopted today, the city was founded more than 1,000 years ago. The estimated date of the urban settlement on the site of Kazan is 1004–1005 AD. The reason for this dating was found during excavations in the Kazan Kremlin – a Czech coin, dated by the Board of St. Wenceslaus (presumably, coinage 929–930 years) and the earliest Czech coin, the remains of masonry and wooden city fence, handicrafts and utensils (Hungarian type lining, women's beads, etc.), as well as other artifacts with less obvious dating. According to official statements, experts from 20 cities of Russia and 22 countries of the world were involved in the study of findings related to the age of Kazan.

Kazan was a border post between Volga Bulgaria and two Finnic peoples—the Mari and Udmurt. Another vexatious question is where the citadel was built originally. Archaeological explorations have produced evidence of urban settlement in three parts of the modern city: in the Kremlin; in Bişbalta at the site of the modern Zilantaw monastery; and near the Qaban lake. The oldest of these seems to be the Kremlin.

After the Mongols ravaged the Bolğar and Bilär territories in the 13th century, the surviving Bulgars recovered in numbers and a small number of Kipchaks were assimilated from which they adopted their language (the so-called Bulgarism), or Kipchaks and Bulgars mixed to create a modern Kazan-Tatar population. Some Tatars also went to Lithuania, brought by Vytautas the great. Kazan became the center of the Principality, which was dependent on The Golden Horde. In the 13th and 14th centuries, Kazan was growing, becoming an important trade and political center within The Golden Horde. The growth of the city was also promoted by the successful geographical location at the intersection of major trade routes connecting East and West. During the same period, the minting of currency began with the indication of the place of minting—"Bulgar al-Jadid", that is, a New Bulgar.

In 1438, the Bulgar fortress Kazan (ISKE-Kazan) was captured by the ousted Golden Horde Khan Ulugh Muhammad, who killed the local Prince Swan and moved the fortress to a modern place (according to Russian Chronicles). The city became the capital of the Khanate of Kazan. The city Bazaar, Taş Ayaq (stone foot) has become the most important shopping center in the region, especially for furniture. Handicraft production also flourished, as the city gained a reputation for its leather and gold products, as well as the wealth of its palaces and mosques. 
Kazan had trade relations with Moscow, Crimea, Turkey, and other regions.

Russian Tsardom period

As a result of the siege of Kazan in 1552, Tsar Ivan the Terrible conquered the city. During the subsequent governorship of Alexander Gorbatyi-Shuisky, most of the Kazan's Tatar residents were forcibly Christianized or deported, the Kerashen Tatars. Mosques and palaces were ruined. Tatars in the Russian service were settled in the Tatar Bistäse settlement near the city's wall. Later Tatar merchants and handicraft masters also settled there. During this period, Kazan was largely destroyed as a result of several great fires. After one of them in 1579, the icon Our Lady of Kazan was discovered in the city.

In the early 17th century, at the beginning of the Time of Troubles in Russia, the Tsardom of Kazan declared independence under the leadership of voyvoda Nikanor Shulgin with the help of the Russian population, but this independence was suppressed by Kuzma Minin in 1612.

Russian Empire period

In 1708, the Tsardom of Kazan was abolished, and Kazan became the seat of Kazan Governorate. After Peter the Great's visit, the city became a center of shipbuilding for the Caspian fleet. The major Russian poet Gavrila Derzhavin was born in Kazan in 1743, the son of a poor country squire of Tatar ancestry though himself having a thoroughly Russian identity.

Before the building of modern dams, low-lying areas were regularly flooded in April and May. Kazan suffered major fires in 1595, 1672, 1694, 1742, 1749, 1757, 1774, 1815, and 1842.

Kazan was largely destroyed in 1774 as a result of the Pugachev revolt (1774–1776), an uprising by border troops and peasants led by the Don Cossack ataman (Captain) Yemelyan Pugachev, but the city, formerly largely of timber construction, was soon afterwards rebuilt, using stone and according to a grid pattern plan, during the reign of Catherine the Great. Catherine also decreed that mosques could again be built in Kazan, the first being Marjani Mosque.

At the beginning of the 19th century Kazan State University and printing press were founded by Alexander I. It became an important center for Oriental Studies in Russia. The Qur'an was first printed in Kazan in 1801. Kazan became an industrial center and peasants migrated there to join its industrial workforce. In 1875, a horse tramway appeared; 1899 saw the installation of a tramway. After the Russian Revolution of 1905, Tatars were allowed to revive Kazan as a Tatar cultural center. The first Tatar theater and the first Tatar newspaper appeared.

Soviet period
In 1917, Kazan became one of the revolution centers. In 1918, Kazan was the capital of the Idel-Ural State, which was suppressed by the Bolshevist government. In the Kazan Operation of August 1918, it was briefly occupied by Czechoslovak Legions. In 1920, Kazan became the center of Tatar Autonomous Soviet Socialist Republic. 
After the Treaty of Rapallo (1922) until 1933, the German and the Russian army operated together the Kama tank school in Kazan.

During World War II, many industrial plants and factories to the west were relocated in Kazan, making the city a center of the military industry, producing tanks and planes. After the war Kazan consolidated as an industrial and scientific center. In 1979, the city's population reached one million.

Modern period

In the late 1980s and in the 1990s, after the dissolution of the Soviet Union, Kazan again became the center of Tatar culture and identity, and separatist tendencies intensified. With the return of capitalism, Kazan became one of the most important centers of the Russian Federation. The city went from 10th to 8th position in population ranking of Russian cities. In the early 2000s, the city earned the right to host both the 2013 Summer Universiade and 2018 FIFA World Cup.

Millennium of Kazan

Since 2000, the city has been undergoing a total renovation. The historical center—including the Kremlin—has been rebuilt, however a large number of the city's historical districts were completely demolished in the renovation. Kazan celebrated its millennium in 2005, after a city-organized historical commission settled on 1005 as the official year of the city's founding. During the millennium celebrations, one of the largest mosque in Russia, Qolsharif, was dedicated in the Kazan Kremlin, the holiest copy of Our Lady of Kazan was returned to the city, the Millennium Bridge was inaugurated that year, and the Kazan Metro began operation. The government of the Russian Federation released the Medal "In Commemoration of the 1000th Anniversary of Kazan".
In 2010, for the preparations to the 2013 Universiade, Kazan began even more renovation by modernizing its airport, fixing the streets, enhancing public transport, and adopting Russian, English, and Tatar languages in all transportation, large stores, and shopping centers.

Heraldry
The historical symbol of Kazan is the mythical dragon-like creature Zilant, often mentioned in legends. For example, when numerous snakes and reptiles severely hampered the development of the city, the hunters went in search of the King of snakes and defeated him, according to another version, the residents of the city bought off the giant snake with gold, after which all the snakes left the city. Another legend says that the giant dragon-like serpent always guarded the Khan's treasures, and that it still protects the hidden wealth before the capture of the city in the secret caves. Historically, it is true that snakes were once numerous in the Kazan region, but then their number has decreased dramatically. The first official coat of arms of Kazan was approved on 18 October 1781 and was described as "black snake under the crown of gold, Kazan, red wings, white field". In 1926, the country introduced a ban on such heraldry. In the 1980s, the coat of arms of Kazan began to reappear, and in the 1990s Kazan Zilant in various styles began to appear in print media. Modern graphics of the emblem and flag appeared in 2005—in a silver field on the green earth a black dragon with red wings and tongue, with gold paws, claws and eyes, topped with a gold crown. The shield is crowned with a Kazan cap. According to the traditions of heraldry, the dragon symbolizes power, wisdom and invincibility, the earth—life and wealth, the crown-development, and the cap above the shield-the capital of the city.

Administrative and municipal status
Kazan is the capital of the republic. Within the framework of administrative divisions, it is incorporated as the city of republic significance of Kazan—an administrative unit with the status equal to that of the districts. As a municipal division, the city of republic significance of Kazan is incorporated as Kazan Urban Okrug.

City divisions

Kazan is divided into seven districts:

Economy

Kazan is one of the largest industrial and financial centers of Russia, and a leading city of the Volga economic region in construction and accumulated investment. The city's gross regional product was 380 billion rubles in 2011.

Total banking capital of Kazan banks is third in Russia. The main industries of the city are: mechanical engineering, chemical, petrochemical, light and food industries. An innovative economy is represented by the largest IT-park in Russia which is one of the largest of its kind among Eastern European science parks. Kazan ranks 174th (highest in Russia) in Mercer's Worldwide Quality of Living Survey.

Investments
In 2011, city organisations and businesses attracted more than 87 billion rubles for economy and social sphere development. This was 44% more than in 2010. In 2014, businesses attracted 86 billion rubles. Most of them have been implemented in the real economy sector.

Because of the unstable economic situation within the country, there was a decrease of investment rates in 2015 and—according to the statistics of the first part of the year—it composed 51684.2 million rubles.

There are head offices of six companies that are in the top 500 in terms of revenues in Russia. The total area of city business centres is 330 thousand square metres.

Innovative economy in Kazan is represented by the biggest IT-park in Russia and also the biggest technical park in Europe. The only online platform for governmental trade except the Moscow one is operated in Kazan. During the post-Soviet period Kazan was the leader in terms of house construction in the Volga region, and now it holds the position and implements the Republican program of liquidation of dilapidated housing which was unique for Russia.

According to Forbes, Kazan was ranked 15th among the "Best cities for business in Russia" of 2010. In 2012, Kazan ranked 6th in the quality of city environment rating, which was made by the Russian Federation Ministry of Regional Development, Russian Alliance of Engineers, Federal Construction Agency, Federal Service of Supervision of Consumer Protection and Welfare and Moscow Federal University.

Transportation

Bus 

The first bus routes in Kazan came to use in 1925. The bus is the most popular type of public transport in Kazan: in 2016, it carried about 74% of passengers. As of 2017, there are about 62 bus routes in the city, with a total length of more than 1.2 thousand km. The total number of buses operating on city routes is 840. The movement of all buses is monitored using an automated control system based on satellite navigation. Any Internet user can track the movement of buses.

Kazan's bus system was totally renovated in 2007. 62 routes have an aggregate length of 1,981 km (1,231 mi). All 1,444 buses are colored red. Half of the buses are imported, produced by Golden Dragon, Higer, MAZ, Yutong, and Hyundai. Other buses are mostly Russian made NefAZ.

The fare is 36 rubles in cash, 31 rubles by credit card and by a special transport card (as of Jul 2022). On the routes, conductors are involved and, in addition to paying for cash (with a higher fare), there are general civil (with different tariff plans for replenishment, including time passes and an "electronic wallet"), as well as preferential electronic transport cards.

Tram 

Kazan's tram system is one of the oldest tram systems in Russia, opened on 20 November 1899. The tram system in Kazan consists of eight operating routes, one of which is a historical excursion route between the railway station and river port. The daily output is 87 trams. Most of the tram lines are laid along the axis of the main streets, most of them on a dedicated track, fenced with side stones. The tram in the city center was largely removed in the 2000s due to the fight against traffic jams on narrow streets; some routes turned out to be unprofitable after the optimization of the transport scheme in 2006–2007.

In 2009–2020, the reconstruction of tram tracks on the main highways was carried out, as well as the construction of four new tram lines, which made it possible to launch circular tram routes No. 5/5a with an accelerated mode of movement in 2012-2020 along the sections of the Big Kazan Ring.

All trams are equipped with autoinformators, announcements in which are in three languages (Russian, Tatar, English), for this reason announcements are played for a very long time (up to one and a half minutes). The fare is 36 rubles in cash, 31 rubles for an electronic card (2022). On the routes, conductors are involved and, in addition to paying for cash (with a higher fare), there are general civil (with different tariff plans for replenishment, including time passes and an "electronic wallet"), as well as preferential electronic transport cards.

Trolleybus 

Kazan's trolleybus system is one of the oldest in Russia. Operation opened on 27 November 1948. In recent years, it continues to develop: new lines were launched, built and planned, while some new trolleybus lines replaced the removed tram lines. At the beginning of the XXI century, at the Kazan aircraft plant KAPO for the city, a major overhaul (CWR) of old trolleybuses was carried out.

The fare is 30 rubles in cash, 27 rubles by electronic card (2020). On the routes, conductors are involved and, in addition to paying for cash (with a higher fare), there are general civil (with different tariff plans for replenishment, including time passes and an "electronic wallet"), as well as preferential electronic transport cards.

All trolleybuses are monitored by an automated control system based on satellite navigation. Any Internet user can track the movement of trolleybuses.

Metro 
A single-line Kazan Metro (running north to south-east), opened on 27 August 2005, the first and only metro system built in a post-soviet state after the collapse of the USSR. As of 2020, the Kazan Metro now has eleven stations, and crosses the Kazanka River.

Railways

Kazan is connected with Moscow, Ulyanovsk, Yoshkar-Ola and Yekaterinburg by train.

The main railway station Kazan–Passazhirskaya is located in the city centre and includes a main building (built in 1896), a commuter trains terminal, a ticket office building and some other technical buildings. The station serves 36 intercity trains, and more than eight million passengers per annum. The second terminus called "Kazan-2" is situated in the northern part of the city. Kazan also has 19 platforms for commuter trains.

In addition, within the city there are also 24 railway stations and stopping platforms.

Public transit
Payment is received in cash, by dedicated travel cards and by banking cards. One ride fee is 27 rubles in cash or by banking card and 25 rubles by travel card. There are various plans for different types of travel which reduce single ride fees. There are no zoning tariffs within the city.

Cycling 
On 1 July 2013, the Veli'k bicycle sharing system was launched in Kazan. In total, the system includes seven self-service bicycle docking stations, and a total fleet of 100 bikes. The service is open to anyone from 16 years of age. There are three types of subscription – monthly, weekly and daily. During the season from late spring to mid-autumn, residents and guests of Kazan typically use the service more than 15,000 times.

In 2015, the first cycle routes on separate bike lanes were opened in the city centre; further expansion is planned throughout the city.

Waterways

Kazan's river port is one of the largest on the Volga, thanks to the system of canals from which Kazan is sometimes called the "port of five seas".

The main building of the river station was built together with the new river port by the early 1960s and renovated in 2005. The station serves both passengers of intercity cruise ships and commuter boats (including high-speed fleet) – to the Kamsky Ustye, Tetyush, Bolgar, Pechishch, Sviyazhsk and Sadovaya. The daily passenger traffic in the summer period is up to 6 thousand people per day. In winter, Pneumocushion boats are used, it goes from Kazan to Verkhny Uslon.

Highways
There are federal highway connections to Moscow and Ufa (E-22), Orenburg (R-239), Ul'yanovsk (R-241) and Igra (R-242). There are also the R-175 federal highway and "Northern Europe – Western China" (in construction) route near the city.

There are five bridges across the Kazanka (Qazansu) river in the city, and one bridge connecting Kazan with the opposite bank of the Volga.

Intercity buses
There are two bus stations in Kazan—Central and Southern. Bus routes connect Kazan with all districts of Tatarstan, Samara, Ufa, Tolyatti, Orenburg, Ulyanovsk, Cheboksary, Sterlitamak, Buzuluk, Baki, and Aktobe. It is planned to build new stations in the East, West and North districts instead of Central for relieving city centre.

Kazan International Airport

It is a hub for UVT Aero and Kazan Air Enterprise and hosts eleven air companies. The airport is connected with the city by bus route #97 and by a suburban train line.

There is also the Kazan Borisoglebskoye airfield, home to Kazan Aircraft Production Association, a major aircraft factory, famous in the past as "Aircraft Plant 22" ("22nd Zavod").

Adjacent to it lies a huge aircraft engines plant ("16th Zavod"). It produces versions of Tupolev 204 and 214 aircraft. In the past an Ilyushin-62, four-engine Russian mainliner, Tupolev-160 "Black Jack" supersonic strategic bomber and Tu-22M tactic bomber were also produced here. Both these plants and adjacent workers' housing make a whole city district known as "Aviastroitelny" ("Aircraft Builders").

Demographics

Population

Population: 
Kazan metropolitan area's population is 1.65 million.

Ethnicity

The city's population consists mostly of ethnic Tatars (47.6%) and ethnic Russians (48.6%). The other ethnicities are Chuvash,  Mari, Ukrainians, Azerbaijanis and Jews.

Religion

Predominant faiths of Kazan city are Islam and Eastern Orthodox Christianity, with minority representation of Roman Catholicism, Protestantism, Judaism, and the Baháʼí Faith.

Languages
The most spoken language in Kazan is Russian, and the Tatar language is the second most spoken.

Geography

Climate 

Kazan has a humid continental climate (Köppen: Dfb) with long, cold winters (colder than Moscow), and warm, sunny summers. As a result of its far inland position, summers are extremely warm for its latitude and winters are quite cold compared to areas further west in Europe.

The city set its two hottest days on record during the 2010 Northern Hemisphere summer heat waves. Temperatures reached  in the hottest days during that time.

Central Kazan

Kremlin

The city has a citadel (Russian: кремль, tr. kreml', or sometimes Tatar: kirman), which was declared a World Heritage Site in 2000. Major monuments in the Kremlin are the five-domed, six-columned Annunciation Cathedral (1561–62) and the mysterious, formerly leaning Söyembikä Tower, named after the last queen of Kazan and regarded as the city's most conspicuous landmark.

Also of interest are the towers and walls, erected in the 16th and 17th centuries but later reconstructed; the Qol-Şarif Mosque, which has been rebuilt inside the citadel; remains of the Saviour Monastery (a 16th-century cathedral demolished by the Bolsheviks) with the Spasskaya Tower; and the Governor's House (1843–53), designed by Konstantin Thon, now the Palace of the President of Tatarstan.

Next door, the ornate baroque Sts-Peter-and-Paul's Cathedral on Qawi Nacmi Street and Marcani Mosque on Qayum Nasiri Street date back to the 18th century.

Towers

The Spasskaya Tower was built in two floors by 16th century Pskov architects Ivan Shiryai and Postnik Yakovlev. From the inside, the northern side of the fortress to the Spasskaya Tower adjoined the gate to Spasskaya Church, which has now merged with the tower. The typical Pskovian architectural elements of the facade face the main street of the Kremlin. At the end of the 17th century, instead of three tiers, the tower was built with two brick eight-sided tiers with a brick roof, getting its present, familiar appearance. Until 1917, the tower was crowned with the double-headed coat of arms of the Russian state. In the 18th century, a ringing clock was installed in the upper tier, and even earlier a large bell was moved from a small belfry (now lost, located on the castle wall on the left side of the tower). Until the middle of the 19th century, there was a moat with a stone bridge in front of the tower.

The South-Western Tower was built simultaneously with the Spasskaya tower by Pskov masters and is a classic example of the Pskov style of defensive structures.

The name of the Transfiguration Tower comes from the Transfiguration Monastery of the Savior, which was fenced from the north-west. The tower was also built by Pskov architects Postnik and Barma, but it was significantly rebuilt later, as it has strong traces of the architectural influence of the Moscow defensive architecture. The territory from the Transfiguration Tower to the Spasskaya pass was added to the old Khan's fortress by Pskov masters.

There are unnamed round brick towers, presumably built by Moscow architects in the 17th century.

The Tainitskaya Tower was built in its present form in the 1550s by Postnik Yakovlev. It was named after a secret source from which it was possible to take water during a siege. The entrance to the tower is in the form of a "knee", which increased the defense of the Kremlin. It replaced a tower from the time of the khanate, Nur Ali (in Russian transcription Muraleeva). The 22-year-old Tsar Ivan the Terrible entered the conquered city through the Nur Ali tower.

The North-Eastern Round Tower was demolished after the Pugachev's assault.

The Consistor Tower was built in brick by Moscow architects in the 17th century, its name was given in the 18th century from the Spiritual Consistory located near the tower in the Kremlin. Near the tower, archaeological excavations revealed the so-called Tezitsky (Arabic for "merchant") Moat, which went from the Consistor Tower to the Transfiguration. Archaeologist N. Kalinin and a number of scientists believed that the moat was the southern border of the Khan's fortress.

The Southeast Round Tower is an example of Pskov architecture of the 16th century.

Bistä, or Posad
Central Kazan is divided into two districts by the Bolaq canal and Lake Qaban. The first district (Qazan Bistäse or Kazanskiy Posad), historically Russian, is situated on the hill, the second (İske Tatar Bistäse or Staro-Tatarskaya Sloboda), historically Tatar, is situated between the Bolaq and the Volga. Mosques, such as Nurullah, Soltan, Bornay, Apanay, Äcem, Märcani, İske Taş, Zäñgär are in the Tatar district. Churches, such as Blagoveschenskaya, Varvarinskaya, Nikol'skaya, Tikhvinskaya, are mostly in the Russian part of the city. The main city-centre streets are Bauman, Kremlyovskaya, Dzerzhinsky, Tuqay, Puşkin, Butlerov, Gorkiy, Karl Marx and Märcani.

An old legend says that in 1552, before the Russian invasion, wealthy Tatars (baylar) hid gold and silver in Lake Qaban.

Wooden Kazan
In the beginning of the 1900s most of Central Kazan was covered by wooden buildings, usually consisting of two floors. There was a historical environment of Kazan citizens, but not the best place to live in. During the Republican program "The liquidation of ramshackle apartments" most of them (unlike other Russian cities), especially in Central Kazan, where the land is not cheap, were destroyed and their population was moved to new areas at the suburb of the city (Azino, Azino-2, Quartal 39). Nearly 100,000 citizens resettled by this programme.

Other major buildings
Another significant building in central Kazan is the former "Smolentzev and Shmelev" tea house and hotel, now the Shalyapin Palace Hotel. It is located at 7/80 Universitetskaya Street, at the corner of Universitetskaya and Bauman. A major landmark of late-19th and early-20th century commercial architecture, it consists of two portions. The original portion, built for a merchant named Usmanov in the 1860s, was bought by the inter-related families of Efim Smolentzev and Pavel and Nikolai Shmelev in 1899. They operated a store selling, among other things, tea. In 1910, the Smolentevs and Shmelevs constructed another portion, designed by architect Vasili Trifonov, and operated a hotel there. After the Russian Revolution, the building eventually became the Hotel Soviet and after 2000 it was heavily renovated to reopen as the Shalyapin Palace Hotel.

Cityscape

Education and science

Primary and secondary education
Primary and secondary education system of Kazan includes:
 282 nurseries, most of which are municipal
 178 schools, 2 of which are private
 28 vocational technical schools
 15 colleges
 10 special colleges

There are also 49 music schools, 43 sports school, and 10 fine-arts schools, including the Kazan Art School founded in 1895.

Higher education

There are 44 institutes of higher education in Kazan, including 19 branches of universities from other cities. More than 140,000 students are educated in the city.
Kazan Federal University (founded in 1804) is third oldest university in Russia after Saint Petersburg State University (1724) and Moscow State University (1755). In 2009 KFU got Federal status as main university of Volga Region.
Some other prominent universities are:
 Kazan State Technical University – founded in 1932. In 2009 it got status of National university
 Kazan State Medical University – founded in 1814 as a department within Kazan State University
 Kazan State Technological University – founded in 1919 on the base of pre-existing vocational school
 Kazan State Conservatory – founded in 1945
 Volga Region State Academy of Physical Culture, Sport and Tourism founded in July 2010 in the framework of the XXVII World Summer Universiade Legacy. The branch, located in Naberezhnye Chelny, will proceed functioning.

Science

Kazan is a major scientific centre in Russia. Kazan formed a big number of scientific areas and schools (mathematical, chemical, medical, linguistic, geological, geobotanical, etc.). Scientific discoveries are a subject of special pride, including: the creation of non-Euclidean geometry (Nikolai Lobachevsky), the discovery of the chemical element ruthenium (Karl Ernst Claus), the theory about the structure of organic compounds (Aleksandr Butlerov), the discovery of the electron paramagnetic resonance (Yevgeny Zavoisky) and acoustic paramagnetic resonance (Altshuler) and many others. The city hosts:
 Kazan Science Centre of Russian Academy of Sciences, since 1945. It includes 5 academic institutions.
 Tatarstan Academy of Sciences, since 1991. It includes 7 local departments with 13 academic institutions (also, 21 organisations are under the guidance of TAS) and one branch in Ulyanovsk.

Public health
The year 1814 is considered to be an official year of the beginning of scientific medicine in Kazan. Exactly at that time University Hospital was open. In 1930 Faculty of Medicine is separated from the Kazan Federal University and holds a lot of specialized hospitals under its patronage. Nowadays Kazan becomes the largest public health center in Russia. 120 medical organisations are operated in the city. Kazan Interregional clinical-diagnostic center is the largest in Volga region in cardiovascular and neurological diseases. The largest hospital in Kazan is Republican Clinical Hospital.

Government and administration

Kazan City Duma is a representative body of the city, elected every four years and holds its sessions in Kazan City Hall.

Executive committee is a municipal body of the executive organs. The committee's head is Denis Kalinkin.

Kazan hosts Tatarstan President's residence and administration (in Kremlin), Tatarstan's Cabinet of Ministers and Council of State (on Freedom square).

Communication

Agency works 84 post offices belonging to the branch of "Russian Post", UFPS "Tatarstan pochtasy". The official opening of the Kazan city telephone network took place on 27 (15) November 1888. At the moment, there are four operators of wired telephone in Kazan. The total capacity of the telephone network in Kazan is about 456,000 numbers. Services of IP-telephony operators in addition to the basic wired connection is also supported by the five companies. The city has six mobile operators (Beeline, MegaFon, MTS, Tele2 Russia, Letai, Yota, and also operates virtual mobile operator "Mobile public communication"). By the number of Internet users—428 thousand people—Kazan takes the 4th place in Russia. According to the General Director of Google Russia Vladimir Dolgov, Kazan is the largest center of information technology development, the level of Internet penetration is 75%, which is a record figure for Russia. Access to the World Wide Web in Kazan is provided by 15 operators. The most popular forms of Internet access are cable networks and ADSL. Previously popular Dial-up has almost lost its position, at the same time actively developing wireless technology Wi-Fi and Wi-Max. Scartel launched the first LTE network in Russia.

On 30 August 2012 in Kazan, IT Park was held a launch ceremony for the fourth generation network (4G, LTE). LTE network in Kazan was launched by three operators – Scartel LLC (Yota trademark), MegaFon OJSC and MTS OJSC. On 27 June 2014, the LTE network of mobile operator Fly was launched.

Sports

Kazan now is one of the most developed cities in Russia in terms of sport. The city has hosted two Bandy World Championships, in 2005 and 2011, the World Summer Universiade 2013, the World Championship in fencing in 2014, the Aquatics Championship FINA 2015, 2017 FIFA Confederations Cup, 2018 FIFA World Cup and other international competitions of various levels. In the future the city will hold the 2022 Special Olympics World Winter Games.

The city of Kazan is a leader in terms of winnings in various sports including its most popular sports teams.

Men's teams:

Notable athletes
 Aliya Mustafina, artistic gymnastics
 Alexander Burmistrov, hockey player
 Viktor Kolotov, association football player
 Ruslan Nigmatullin, association football player
 Denis Arkhipov, hockey player
 Svetlana Demina, sport shooter
 Marat Safin, tennis player
 Dinara Safina, tennis player
 Alexander Fadeev, figure skater
 Evgenia Tarasova, figure skater
 Kamila Valieva, figure skater
 Vasily Mosin, sport shooter

Infrastructure
 Kazan Arena – stadium with capacity 45,000, home ground for FC Rubin
 Central stadium – Olympic stadium, capacity 30,133. Ex-home ground for FC Rubin.
 TatNeft Arena – indoor sporting arena, capacity 10,000. Home to HSC Aq Bars
 Basket-Hall – indoor sporting arena, capacity 7,000 (large hall) and 1,500 (small hall). Home to BC UNICS.
 Kazan Volleyball Centre, capacity 4,600. Home to VC Zenit and WVC Dynamo-Kazan.
 Raketa and Trudovye Rezervy ice stadiums

Important events
 2005 Bandy World Championship
 2010 finswimming European championship
 2011 European Weightlifting Championships
 2011 Bandy World Championship
 2013 Summer Universiade
 2014 European Badminton Championships
 2015 World Aquatics Championships
 2016 – 28th International Olympiad in Informatics
 2016 European Judo Championships
 2017 Red Bull Air Race World Championship
 2017 FIFA Confederations Cup
 2018 Red Bull Air Race World Championship
 2018 FIFA World Cup
 2019 Candidates Tournament for the Women's World Chess Championship 2020
 2019 WorldSkills Championship
 2022 Special Olympics World Winter Games

International relations
Kazan is actively engaged in international activities. The city has foreign diplomatic, trade and cultural representations, the Kazan Kremlin and the Institute of culture of peace are under the auspices of UNESCO, the city participates in partner movements, is a member of the world organizations of cities. The summit of the CIS heads, the Summit of the world security services and other important forums, conferences and events of the world level were held in Kazan. The head of China, the US Secretary of State, about three dozen presidents and Prime Ministers of foreign States paid visits to the capital of the Republic, as to few other cities of the country. Renovated in 2005, the international airport provides flights to dozens of cities in different countries, including the largest airliners (class Boeing 747), and is gradually being rebuilt into a potential hub for the Universiade 2013 and the World Cup 2018; international rail links from the city.

Branch offices of embassies
  Branch Office of the Embassy of Belarus

Consulates
Five consulates general are found in Kazan.

  Consulate-General of Iran
  Consulate-General of Turkey
  Consulate-General of Hungary
  Consulate-General of Kazakhstan
  Consulate-General of Turkmenistan

Visa centers
  Italian Visa Center in Kazan.
  Joint Visa Application Center of European Union for:

Twin towns and sister cities

Kazan is twinned with:

  Al Minufiyah, Egypt, since 1997
  Al Qalyubiyah (Egypt), since 2001
  Ankara (Turkey), since 2013
  Antalya (Turkey), since 2003
  Braunschweig (Germany), since 1988
  College Station, Texas, United States, since 1990
  Donetsk (Ukraine), since 2002
  Eskişehir (Turkey), since 1997
  Guangzhou (China), since 2012
  Hangzhou (China), since 2002
  Harare (Zimbabwe), since 2011
  Istanbul (Turkey), since 2002
  Nur-Sultan (Kazakhstan), since 2004
  Shenzhen (China), since 2012
  Tabriz (Iran), since 2009

Kazan has also partner relations with the following cities and regions:

  Almaty (Kazakhstan), since 1996
  Arkhangelsk (Russia), since 1999
  Astrakhan (Russia), since 1997
  Baku (Azerbaijan), since 2003
  Bishkek (Kyrgyzstan), since 1998
  Chelyabinsk (Russia), since 2002
  Chengdu (China), since 2015
  Evpatoria (Ukraine), since 1998
  Grozny (Russia), since 2012
  Gwangju (Korea), since 2013
  Ivanovo (Russia), since 1997
  Jūrmala (Latvia), since 2002
  Kabul (Afghanistan), since 2005
  Krasnoyarsk (Russia), since 2001
  Nizhny Novgorod (Russia), since 1997
  Orenburg (Russia), since 2001
  Oryol (Russia), since 2010
  Samara (Russia), since 1998
  Saratov (Russia), since 1999
  Shumen Province (Bulgaria), since 2003
  Tashkent (Uzbekistan), since 1998
  Tlemcen (Algeria), since 2011
  Tyumen (Russia), since 2013
  Ufa (Russia), since 1999
  Ulan-Ude (Russia), since 2003
  Ulyanovsk (Russia), since 1998
  Urbino (Italy), since 2001
  Verona (Italy), since 2011
  Volgograd (Russia), since 2005
  Yaroslavl (Russia), since 2003
  Yoshkar-Ola (Russia), since 2002

International organizations membership

 Organization of World Heritage Cities
 United Cities and Local Governments
 Twin Cities International Association
 Historic Cities International Association
 General Conference of Mayors for Peace
 Organisation of Islamic Capitals and Cities (observer)
 Metropolis
 International Assembly of capitals and large cities of CIS

Other organizations

 Alliance Française
 American Corner

Notable people

 Aida Garifullina, lyric soprano, the I-st prize winner at the Operalia competition in 2013, many performances at Mariinsky Theatre and Vienna State Opera, recording contract with Decca Records
 Venera Gimadieva, operatic soprano who has performed leading roles in major European opera houses
 Sofya Gulyak, pianist, only female winner of the Leeds Piano Competition, in 2009
 Dayana Kirillova, singer who represented Russia at the Junior Eurovision Song Contest in 2013
 Rashid Nezhmetdinov, International Master and five-time winner of the Russian Chess Championship
 Kamila Valieva, figure skater

See also
Arskoe Cemetery
Kizichesky Monastery
Russian Islamic University
Saints Peter and Paul Cathedral (Kazan)

References

Notes

Sources

Further reading
 
 .
Edward Tracy Turnerelli, Kazan, the Ancient Capital of the Tartar Khans, 1854.

External links

 Official website of Kazan 

 
11th-century establishments in Russia
11th-century establishments in Europe
Cities and towns in Tatarstan
Kazansky Uyezd
Populated places established in the 11th century
Populated places on the Volga